Jeffrey Dean Morgan (born April 22, 1966) is an American actor of television and film, best known for playing the character Negan in the AMC horror drama series The Walking Dead (2016–2022), for which he has received critical acclaim. He has also appeared in such television roles as John Winchester in the CW fantasy horror series Supernatural (2005–2007; 2019), Denny Duquette in the ABC medical drama series Grey's Anatomy (2006–2009),  Jason Crouse in the CBS political drama series The Good Wife (2015–2016), the Comedian in the superhero film Watchmen (2009), as well as film roles including Clay in The Losers (2010), Sgt. Andrew Tanner in Red Dawn (2012), and Agent Harvey Russell in Rampage (2018).

Early life
Morgan was born in Seattle, Washington to Sandy Thomas and Richard Dean Morgan. He is of partial Ossetian descent on his mothers side. He graduated from Lake Washington High School in 1984 and briefly attended Skagit Valley College to pursue a career in basketball. Following a leg injury that ended his hope of becoming a professional player, he left school to pursue his other interests such as painting and writing. While helping a friend move from Seattle to Los Angeles, intending only to stay for a weekend, he decided to live there permanently to pursue acting. "I fell into acting, found out I had a little talent and pursued it."

Career
Starting with Uncaged (1991), Morgan has appeared in over 25 feature films. However, the bulk of his work has been in television. He was a major character in the 1996–97 television series The Burning Zone, appearing in eleven of its nineteen episodes.

In 2005 and 2006, Morgan simultaneously appeared in three television series: in the CW series Supernatural as John Winchester, in a recurring role on ABC's Grey's Anatomy as heart transplant patient Denny Duquette, and as Judah Botwin in two episodes of the Showtime series Weeds. He has also guest-starred in a number of television series, including ER, JAG, Walker, Texas Ranger, Angel, CSI: Crime Scene Investigation, Sliders, The O.C. and Monk. In 2007, Morgan was cast in a proposed project by Grey's Anatomy creator Shonda Rhimes. The series, tentatively titled "Correspondents", was to have started production in summer 2007. ABC instead picked up a spin-off of Grey's Anatomy, called Private Practice, that was also created by Rhimes. As a result, "Correspondents" was shelved.

In 2007, Morgan starred in the film The Accidental Husband, which finished filming in March 2007 and was released on DVD in 2009.

Morgan starred in the thriller The Resident in 2011. He also appeared in the drama film Days of Wrath in 2008.

In 2009, Morgan portrayed The Comedian, a cigar-chomping antihero in Watchmen, based on Alan Moore's graphic novel. In the same year, Morgan appeared in Taking Woodstock, and played Clay in a comic book film adaptation of The Losers. He also played Jeb Turnbull in the DC comic book film Jonah Hex.

Morgan appeared in the crime thriller Texas Killing Fields as a homicide detective in 2011. The following year, Morgan starred in the television drama series Magic City, which centered on mob life in 1950s Miami. The same year, Morgan starred in the horror-thriller The Possession, and had a supporting role in the war film Red Dawn.

In 2014, Morgan played Charlie Peters, the owner of the Cake House, in the season finale of Shameless.

In November 2014, Morgan was cast as Joe DiMaggio opposite Kelli Garner as Marilyn Monroe in The Secret Life of Marilyn Monroe, a Lifetime four-hour miniseries based on J. Randy Taraborrelli's book of the same name.

In 2015, Morgan portrayed Deaf Smith in Texas Rising, a five-part mini-series which aired on the History Channel. Also in 2015, Morgan became a regular cast member for season 2 of the CBS sci-fi drama Extant. He appeared in an uncredited role in Batman v Superman: Dawn of Justice, as Bruce Wayne's father, Thomas Wayne.

In 2015, Morgan took on the role of freelance investigator Jason Crouse, opposite Julianna Margulies, in the CBS TV series The Good Wife, until that series concluded in the spring of 2016. That year Morgan began his most noted role to date, as Negan on the AMC TV series The Walking Dead. He made his first appearance in the sixth-season finale on April 3, 2016, serving as the primary antagonist of the seventh and eighth seasons and later an anti-hero since the ninth season. He later lent his voice to the character when he was added as DLC in the fighting game Tekken 7. In 2015, he had a lead role in Jonás Cuarón's thriller film Desierto.

On May 28, 2017, Morgan drove the 2017 Chevrolet Corvette Grand Sport Pace Car to lead the starting field of the 101st Indianapolis 500. In September, Morgan appeared in a commercial for the online game Evony.

Morgan was 5th billed in the Dwayne Johnson film Rampage, released in April 2018.

Morgan reprised his role as John Winchester in the thirteenth episode of the fourteenth season of Supernatural, which was also the 300th episode of the series. It aired on February 7, 2019.

In August 2022, Morgan was cast in the fourth season of The Boys.

Personal life
Morgan was married to actress Anya Longwell from 1992 to 2003. In 2007, he was briefly engaged to his former Weeds co-star Mary Louise Parker; their engagement ended in April 2008.

In 2009, actress and producer Sherrie Rose told Us Weekly that she had a son with Morgan, born circa 2004–2005.
Morgan has not confirmed this.

In 2009, Morgan began a relationship with actress Hilarie Burton after being set up on a blind date through his Supernatural co-star Jensen Ackles and Ackles's wife, Danneel, with whom Burton co-starred on One Tree Hill. The couple's son was born on March 14, 2010. After 8 years of infertility, their daughter was born on February 16, 2018. On October 5, 2019, the couple got married, although many erroneously speculated they had married in 2014.

Morgan and Burton have made their home in Rhinebeck in Dutchess County, New York, on a 100-acre working farm in the Hudson Valley with cows, ducks, chickens, alpacas, donkeys, and an emu. Since 2014, they have been co-owners (along with Morgan's friend, actor Paul Rudd) of Samuel's Sweet Shop, a Rhinebeck candy store they saved from being closed after the previous owner, a friend of theirs, died suddenly.

In 2019, Morgan purchased an apartment in the NoHo neighborhood of Lower Manhattan in New York City.

Filmography

Film

Television

Video games

References

External links

 
 
 

20th-century American male actors
21st-century American male actors
American male film actors
American male television actors
Living people
Male actors from Seattle
People from Kirkland, Washington
1966 births